Heroine is the first solo album by Japanese singer Minori Chihara.

Track listing

"Jellybeans"

 "Naked Heart"
 "Emotional"

References

Minori Chihara albums
2004 debut albums